Ana Družić (born 14 June 1992) is a Croatian former women's footballer, who played for ŽNK Viktorija Slavonski Brod and made one appearance for the Croatia women's national football team.

Career
Družić started out playing for the youth team at ŽNK Viktorija Slavonski Brod. For the 2010–11 season, she joined the club's senior team. She made her debut in a 4–0 loss to Agram, being substituted in after 38 minutes for Jasna Kolundžić. She made 15 appearances for Viktorija in her three seasons there, not scoring. Družić made five appearances for Croatia U-17s, and two appearances for Croatia U-19s. She made her only senior appearance for the Croatian senior team in a 2009 1–1 draw against Bosnia and Herzegovina, being substituted off 63 minutes in.

She has not played professionally since 2013, when she left Viktorija.

References

1992 births
Living people
Croatian women's footballers
Croatia women's international footballers
Women's association footballers not categorized by position
Sportspeople from Slavonski Brod
Croatian Women's First Football League players
ŽNK Viktorija Slavonski Brod players